Protocollyris is a genus of tiger beetles in the family Cicindelidae, tribe Collyridini

Species
The following species are included:

 Protocollyris antennalis (Horn, 1909) 
 Protocollyris brevilabris (Horn, 1893)
 Protocollyris bryanti Mandl, 1975 
 Protocollyris faceta Naviaux & Cassola, 2005
 Protocollyris festiva Naviaux, 2008 
 Protocollyris fragilis Naviaux, 2004 
 Protocollyris grossepunctata (Horn, 1935) 
 Protocollyris longiceps Mandl, 1975 
 Protocollyris mindanaoensis (Mandl, 1974) 
 Protocollyris montana Naviaux, 2008
 Protocollyris nilgiriensis Naviaux, 2003
 Protocollyris okajimai Mandl, 1982 
 Protocollyris pacholatkoi Naviaux, 2003
 Protocollyris philippinensis (Mandl, 1974) 
 Protocollyris planifrons (Horn, 1905) 
 Protocollyris probsti Naviaux, 1994 
 Protocollyris sauteri (Horn, 1912)

References

Cicindelidae